William Henry Hastie Jr. (November 17, 1904 – April 14, 1976) was an American lawyer, judge, educator, public official, and civil rights advocate. He was the first African American to serve as Governor of the United States Virgin Islands, as a federal judge, and as a federal appellate judge. He served as a United States circuit judge of the United States Court of Appeals for the Third Circuit and previously served as District Judge of the District Court of the Virgin Islands.

Early life and education 

Hastie was born in Knoxville, Tennessee, the son of William Henry Hastie, Sr. and Roberta Childs. His maternal ancestors were African American and Native American, but European
American is also a strong possible mix. Family tradition held that one female ancestor was a Malagasy princess. He graduated from Dunbar High School, a top academic school for black students. Hastie attended Amherst College in Massachusetts, where he graduated first in his class, magna cum laude, and Phi Beta Kappa, receiving an Artium Baccalaureus degree. He received a Bachelor of Laws from Harvard Law School in 1930, followed by a Doctor of Juridical Science from the same institution in 1933.

Career

Legal work 
Hastie entered the private practice of law in Washington, D.C. from 1930 to 1933. From 1933 to 1937 he served as assistant solicitor for the United States Department of the Interior, advising the agency on racial issues. He had worked with his second cousin, Charles Hamilton Houston, to establish a joint law practice.

In 1937, President Franklin D. Roosevelt appointed Hastie to the District Court of the Virgin Islands, making Hastie the first African-American federal judge. This was a controversial action; Democratic United States Senator William H. King of Utah, the Chairman of the United States Senate Committee on the Judiciary called Hastie's appointment a "blunder."

In 1939, Hastie resigned from the court to become the Dean of the Howard University School of Law, where he had previously taught. During his tenure as a legal professor at Howard University, Hastie had become a member of Omega Psi Phi fraternity. One of his students was Thurgood Marshall, who led the Legal Defense Fund for the NAACP and was appointed as a United States Supreme Court Justice.

Hastie served as a co-lead lawyer with Thurgood Marshall in the voting rights case of Smith v. Allwright, 321 U.S. 649 (1944) in which the Supreme Court ruled against white primaries. One of Houston's sons became a name partner at the law firm.

World War II 

During World War II, Hastie worked as a civilian aide to the United States Secretary of War Henry Stimson from 1940 to 1942. He vigorously advocated the equal treatment of African Americans in the United States Army and their unrestricted use in the war effort.

On January 15, 1943, Hastie resigned his position in protest against racially segregated training facilities in the United States Army Air Forces, inadequate training for African-American pilots, and the unequal distribution of assignments between whites and non-whites. That same year, he received the Spingarn Medal from the NAACP, both for his lifetime achievements and in recognition of this protest action.

In 1946, President Harry S. Truman appointed Hastie as Territorial Governor of the United States Virgin Islands. He was the first African American to hold this position. Hastie served as governor from 1946 to 1949.

Federal judicial service

Hastie received a recess appointment from President Harry S. Truman on October 21, 1949, to the United States Court of Appeals for the Third Circuit, to a new seat authorized by 63 Stat. 493, becoming the first African-American federal appellate judge. He was nominated to the same position by President Truman on January 5, 1950. He was confirmed by the United States Senate on July 19, 1950, and received his commission on July 22, 1950. He served as Chief officer as a member of the Judicial Conference of the United States from 1968 to 1971. He assumed senior status on May 31, 1971. He was a Judge of the Temporary Emergency Court of Appeals from 1972 to 1976. His service terminated on April 14, 1976, when he died in Philadelphia while he was playing golf.

Supreme Court consideration
As the first African American on the Federal bench, Hastie was considered as a possible candidate to be the first African-American Justice of the Supreme Court. In an interview with Robert Penn Warren for the book Who Speaks for the Negro?, Hastie commented that as a judge, he had not been able to be "out in the hustings, and to personally sample grassroots reaction" but that for the Civil Rights Movement to succeed, both class and race must be considered.

In 1962, President John F. Kennedy considered appointing Hastie to succeed retiring Justice Charles Whittaker. But due to political calculations he did not do so, as he believed that an African-American appointee would have faced fierce opposition in the United States Senate from Southerners such as James Eastland (D-Mississippi), the chairman of the Judiciary Committee. Conversely, on issues other than civil rights, Hastie was considered relatively moderate, and Chief Justice Earl Warren was reportedly "violently opposed" to Hastie, as he would be too conservative as a justice. Justice William O. Douglas reportedly told Robert F. Kennedy that Hastie would be "just one more vote for Frankfurter." Kennedy appointed Byron White instead.

Kennedy said that he expected to make several more appointments to the Supreme Court in his presidency and that he intended to appoint Hastie to the Court at a later date.

Legacy

Hastie was an elected member of both the American Academy of Arts and Sciences and the American Philosophical Society. The Third Circuit Library in Philadelphia is named in Hastie's honor. A permanent memorial room in his honor is hosted by The Beck Cultural Exchange Center in Knoxville, Tennessee, which also houses his personal papers. In addition, an urban natural area in South Knoxville is named in his honor.

In terms of African-American history, Hastie developed from a youthful radical to a scholarly, calm, almost aloof jurist. He said the judge always ought to be in the middle, for his basic responsibility "is to maintain neutrality while giving the best objective judgment of the contest between adversaries." As a scion of an elite black family, he reflected its integrationist viewpoint. He said, "The Negro lawyer has played and continues to play, a very important role in the American Negro's struggle for equality." A temptation to activism lurked just below his calm surface, as when he demonstrated against Jim Crow before it was fashionable to do that. When he resigned as the top aide on racial matters to the War Department in 1943, he said it was caused by "reactionary policies and discriminatory practices in the Army and Air Forces."

Hastie's daughter, Karen Hastie Williams, was a prominent lawyer, and the first woman of colour appointed clerk to a U.S. Supreme Court Justice.

See also
 John F. Kennedy Supreme Court candidates
 List of African-American jurists
 List of African-American federal judges
 List of first minority male lawyers and judges in the United States

References

Sources

 
 
 Negro Soldiers Defended. New York Times. Oct 4, 1941. p. 14, 1 p
 Army Aide Quits; Protests Negro Pilot Treatment. Chicago Daily Tribune. Feb 1, 1943. p. 21, 1 p
 Hastie Nominated For Governorship Of Virgin Islands. The Washington Post. Jan 6, 1946. p. M1, 2 pp

External links
 Part of his life is retold in the radio drama "The Boy Who Beat the Bus", a presentation from Destination Freedom

1904 births
1976 deaths
20th-century American judges
African-American judges
African-American people in United States Virgin Island politics
American people of Malagasy descent
Amherst College alumni
Governors of the United States Virgin Islands
Harvard Law School alumni
Howard University faculty
Judges of the United States Court of Appeals for the Third Circuit
Judges of the United States District Court of the Virgin Islands
People from Knoxville, Tennessee
Spingarn Medal winners
United States court of appeals judges appointed by Harry S. Truman
Dunbar High School (Washington, D.C.) alumni
Members of the American Philosophical Society